Douglas Arnold Flower (November 24, 1916 – July 30, 2009) was a Canadian politician. He served in the Legislative Assembly of New Brunswick from 1967 to 1970 as a member of the Liberal party.

References

1916 births
2009 deaths